William Donaldson Cruddas (1831 – 8 February 1912) was a British business director and politician.

Born in Elswick, Cruddas became a director of the Elswick Works, and chairman of the Newcastle and Gateshead Water Company.  He also became a justice of the peace.  At the 1895 UK general election, he was elected for the Conservative Party in Newcastle-upon-Tyne, but he retired in 1900.  In 1903, he was appointed as High Sheriff of Northumberland.

References

1831 births
1912 deaths
Conservative Party (UK) MPs for English constituencies
High Sheriffs of Northumberland
Politicians from Newcastle upon Tyne
UK MPs 1895–1900